Newport City Football Club is an association football club based in the Llanwern area of the city of Newport, South Wales. The club plays in the Ardal League South East, tier 3 of the Welsh football pyramid.

History
The club was formed in 1963 as Spencer Works AFC and joined the Newport and District Football League.

Moving up to the Gwent Premier League, winning it in 1970–71 and 1971–72 and then elected to the Welsh league for the 1972–73 season.

They spent most of the next twenty seasons in the middle division of the league until 1988 when they changed their name to Llanwern AFC to reflect the change of name of the steelworks on whose ground they played. This change coincided with a change in the club's fortunes and they gained promotion to the top division in 1992–3.

They spent a number of years between the top two divisions and in 2002 they won the Welsh Football League Cup.

In 2003, they re-located to the Newport Stadium, where they have played ever since.

League re-organisation led to Newport City dropping to Division Three in 2010–11 spending two seasons there before promotion back to Division Two for the 2014–5 season.

In May 2016 the FAW agreed that the club could change its name to Newport City FC for the 2016–17 season.

With the club being saved at the last minute by Matthew Rake (now Honorary President) they had to look at a rebuild with the squad not at a level to compete in League 2. The club at the time was being led by Crawford Chalmers who had an impressive CV in football and was at the time working as a Director of Football at Oxford United. With no experience in Welsh League football it did not take long for Crawford's plans to turn south with the club rock bottom of the division and no sign of improvement. The club bought in Sam Houldsworth who was appointed joint manager after a successful period as Assistant Manage at Pontypridd Town AFC. The season before had seen Sam Houldsworth help Pontypridd win their division and it seemed perfect timing for him to join Newport City FC and help the club improve both on and off the field. First game in charge and Houldsworth helped land an unexpected 3–2 victory away to Abergavenny Town, the team's first win in seven games. A huge revamp of players and staff was not enough to save the club from relegation from Division 2 after a valiant attempt at survival. Adrift by 16 points of safety when Houldsworth was appointed and in the end a 5-point short fall meant the inevitable of life next season in Division 3.

In the two seasons to follow the club bought in more players to help the club stay in Division 3 and off the pitch more backroom staff were appointed to help take the club from being a senior men's team and turn it into a club with over 100 players. Newport City FC is now proud to be the home of a Women's team, two Men's teams, a Youth team and six Junior clubs. With the club looking to progress and plan to grow the number of players and coaches it has seen a once small team playing in the city of Newport turn into somewhat of a sleeping giant within the Welsh Pyramid.

With the club making the Tier 3 structuring the city of Newport has a team well equipped to progress in the Welsh pyramid of football. A City spurred on by the success of Newport County, Newport Dragons, Newport Rugby club and the well respected Newport Cricket Club will hopefully have a club in the Welsh Pyramid which follows suit. Under the current leadership The Steelmen look to add more teams to the ever growing club and one day be able to provide a clear pathway for players aged 4 through to senior football both male and female.

Current squad
As of October 2020.

Staff and board members
 Chairman: Sam Houldsworth 
 Manager: Sam Houldsworth
 Asst Managers: Peter Francombe
 Secretary: Sam Houldsworth (Temporary)
 Asst Sec: Phil Butler

References

External links
Official website

Football clubs in Wales
Football clubs in Newport, Wales
Association football clubs established in 1963
1963 establishments in Wales
Welsh Football League clubs
Ardal Leagues clubs